Christian Meira Lindell (born 20 November 1991) is an inactive professional tennis player from Brazil who plays for Sweden. He has played seven Davis Cup matches, with a 4–3 record.

Personal information
He has a Swedish father and a Brazilian mother.

Although he has lived his entire life in Brazil, Lindell represents Sweden through a curious chain of events. Despite having been one of the best Brazilian juniors in his age group, he was not picked to play for Brazil in the South American Junior Championships in 2007. A few months later, while on holiday in Sweden, he decided to play in the Swedish Junior Championships. Lindell won the title and received an invitation to train with the Swedish Tennis Federation and to represent Sweden, which he accepted.

On 15 May 2011 Lindell was invited to join Sweden's number one singles player Robin Söderling and the doubles pairing of Simon Aspelin and Robert Lindstedt for the 2011 Power Horse World Team Cup. He faced the top-tier players John Isner, Mikhail Kukushkin and Juan Ignacio Chela, but lost his three matches.

On 6 February 2012, Lindell announced via Twitter that he would be representing Brazil from then on. Then, in June, it emerged that Lindell had again swapped allegiances. The Swedish tennis site tennissverige.se reported that because the Brazilian Tennis Confederation wouldn't fund him to train with his long-term Swedish coach Julius Demburg, Lindell had decided to return to the Swedish Federation, allegedly for good this time.

Challenger and Futures/World Tennis Tour Finals

Singles: 31 (13-18)
{|
|-valign=top
|

Doubles: 13 (7–6)

References

External links
 
 
 

Brazilian male tennis players
Brazilian people of Swedish descent
Sportspeople from Rio de Janeiro (city)
Swedish male tennis players
Swedish people of Brazilian descent
1991 births
Living people